College de France or variation, may refer to:

 Collège de France, Paris, France; a tertiary education and research institute
 Collèges de France (formerly Collège de France), Antananarivo, Madagascar; a French international school
 Collège International Marie de France (formerly Collège Marie de France), Montreal, Quebec, Canada; a private school named after poet Marie de France

See also

 List of universities and colleges in France
 French College in Agadir, Quartier Founty-Bensergao, Agadir, Morocco; a French international school